Jogeshwari (Pronunciation: [d͡ʒoɡeːʃʋəɾiː]) is a suburb located in the western part of Mumbai, Maharashtra, India. It is notable for its caves - 'Jogeshwari Caves', particularly one containing a shrine of the Hindu Goddess Jogeshwari, Lord Shiva and the deity Hanuman. It belongs to the K/E Ward of Mumbai.

On the Mumbai Suburban Railway, (which is part of the Indian Western Railway line,) that runs from Churchgate to Dahanu, Jogeshwari is north of and next to Andheri and has a train station of the same name.

The Jogeshwari - Vikhroli Link Road connects Jogeshwari a western suburb of Mumbai with Vikhroli an eastern suburb. This road typically experiences traffic jams during peak hours but has improved access and connectivity between the city's suburbs.
For healthcare a public governed HBT trauma hospital is located near the Western express highway.

Education
 Ismail Yusuf College of Arts, Science and Commerce, Jogeshwari (East), Mumbai.

References

Suburbs of Mumbai
Mumbai Suburban district